The 1988–89 FC Bayern Munich season was the 89th season in the club's history and 24th season since promotion from Regionalliga Süd in 1965.  Bayern won its tenth Bundesliga Title.  This title was the fourth title in five seasons.  The club reached the third round of the DFB-Pokal and the semifinals of the UEFA Cup.  Several changes were made to the roster with eight players leaving via transfer or loan, including Lothar Matthäus, Andreas Brehme and Jean-Marie Pfaff.  Six new players joined the club, including Olaf Thon, Stefan Reuter, Roland Grahammer, and Johnny Ekström.

Results

Friendlies

Fuji-Cup

Wembley International Tournament

Bundesliga

Results by round

League standings

DFB Pokal

UEFA Cup

1st round

2nd round

3rd round

Quarter-finals

Semi-finals

Team statistics

Players

Squad, appearances and goals

|}

Bookings

Transfers

In

Out

References

FC Bayern Munich seasons
Bayern
German football championship-winning seasons